Cotonou Lighthouse is a lighthouse in Cotonou, Benin. It was established in 1910.  A second skeletal tower was built in 1928, and that light was moved to the water tower in 1968.

See also
 List of lighthouses in Benin

References

Lighthouses completed in 1910
Lighthouses in Benin
Buildings and structures in Benin
Lighthouses completed in 1928
Lighthouses completed in 1968
1910 establishments in Africa
Buildings and structures in Cotonou